The River Keer is a river in England. It flows through the English counties of Lancashire and Cumbria.

For parts of its course, the Keer marks the boundary between Lancashire and Cumbria, as well as the ancient counties of Lancashire and Westmorland.

The river rises on Docker Moor near the village of Whittington and follows a westerly course, passing the villages of Capernwray, Borwick and Warton, as well as Pine Lake, before reaching Carnforth, after which the river runs through salt marshes before pouring into the Kent estuary and Morecambe Bay.

Keer, River
Keer, River
Westmorland
Keer